Bohrau is an ortsteil of the town of Forst in Lower Lusatia, Brandenburg, Germany, on the Neiße river bordering Poland. It has a population of 109.

History
From 1815 to 1947, Bohrau was part of the Prussian Province of Brandenburg. From 1952 to 1990, it was part of the Bezirk Cottbus of East Germany.

References

Towns in Brandenburg